Manoba fasciatus is a moth in the family Nolidae. It was described by George Hampson in 1894. It is found in the Indian states of Sikkim and Assam, and in Thailand and Japan.

References

Moths described in 1894
Nolinae